Sofifi is a town on the west coast of the Indonesian island of Halmahera, and since 2010 has been the capital of the province of North Maluku. It is located in North Oba (Oba Utara) District of the city of Tidore Islands. At the 2020 Census, the town had a population of 2,498, while North Oba District had a population of 19,552. Previously, Ternate had been the province's capital.

Tourism-wise, Sofifi is far from being a popular destination. It is a spread-out place connected by wide roads and interspersed with forlorn-looking government buildings, Sofifi serves travellers mainly as a junction on the route to Tobelo.

Climate
Sofifi has a tropical rainforest climate (Köppen Af) with heavy rainfall year-round.

References

Tidore
Populated coastal places in Indonesia
Populated places in North Maluku
Provincial capitals in Indonesia